Rebecca Leigh Mader (born 24 April 1977) is an English actress, best known for her roles as Charlotte Lewis in the ABC series Lost, and as Zelena, the Wicked Witch of the West, on ABC's Once Upon a Time, for which she garnered critical acclaim.

Life and career
Mader was born in 1977 in Cambridge, England. She worked as a model in New York City for a year, appearing in adverts for L'Oréal, Colgate and Wella Hair. She began her television career on the ABC daytime soap operas All My Children as Morgan Gordon, and One Life to Live as Margaret Cochran. She also appeared on the soap opera Guiding Light in 2003.

Mader has made a number of guest appearances on television shows. In 2006, she had a series regular role on the short-lived Fox legal drama Justice. In 2008, Mader began starring as anthropologist Charlotte Lewis on ABC series Lost. She appeared in the show from 2008 to 2009 and in two episodes in 2010. In 2011, she had a recurring role on No Ordinary Family, and in 2012, she made a guest starring appearance on the Fox science-fiction series Fringe as Jessica Holt. Also in 2012, Mader starred in the short-lived ABC comedy series Work It.

In June 2013, Mader made her stage debut in the role of Barrie in the one-act comedy The Third Date at the Hollywood Fringe Festival.

In December 2013, Mader was cast as the Wicked Witch of the West, a new antagonist for the second half of the third season of Once Upon a Time. She also made guest appearances during the second half of the fourth season and was later promoted to a series regular for the fifth and sixth seasons. In May 2017, Mader announced that she would not be returning for the seventh season of the show due to a creative decision by the showrunners. However, in September 2017, it was announced that Mader would be reprising her role as Zelena in a recurring capacity for the second half of the seventh season. In all, she made seven appearances in the seventh season, including the series finale "Leaving Storybrooke".

In May 2020, during the COVID-19 lockdown in California, Mader created the "At Home with Sean and Bex" interview series on YouTube with Once Upon a Time co-star Sean Maguire.

Personal life
Mader's first husband was businessman Joseph Arongino. They divorced in 2008.

On 29 December 2014, Mader announced her engagement to producer Marcus Kayne. The two were married on 23 November 2016 and she gave birth to their first child Milo, a son, in November 2019. Mader announced on 7 April 2021 that she was expecting her second child, a girl. Mader announced the birth of her second child, a girl, Bailey, who was born September 2, 2021.

Filmography

Film

Television

Web

References

External links

English female models
English film actresses
English television actresses
English soap opera actresses
Living people
English expatriates in the United States
People from Cambridge
Actresses from Cambridgeshire
1977 births
English emigrants to the United States